Mountain View is a historic home near Chatham, Pittsylvania County, Virginia. The house was built about 1840–1842, and is a -story, Late Federal-style brick dwelling. It is topped by a gable roof and has a double-pile central-hall plan. Also on the property are the contributing original kitchen building, schoolhouse, office, smokehouse, and corn crib. The property also contains remnants of an elaborate 19th-century formal garden, a feature characteristic of the region's finer estates.

It was listed on the National Register of Historic Places in 1979.

References

Houses on the National Register of Historic Places in Virginia
Federal architecture in Virginia
Houses completed in 1842
Houses in Pittsylvania County, Virginia
National Register of Historic Places in Pittsylvania County, Virginia